Donald Rodney Justice (August 12, 1925 – August 6, 2004) was an American teacher of writing and poet who won the Pulitzer Prize for Poetry in 1980.

In summing up Justice's career, David Orr wrote, "In most ways, Justice was no different from any number of solid, quiet older writers devoted to traditional short poems. But he was different in one important sense: sometimes his poems weren't just good; they were great. They were great in the way that Elizabeth Bishop's poems were great, or Thom Gunn's or Philip Larkin's. They were great in the way that tells us what poetry used to be, and is, and will be."

Life and career
Justice grew up in Miami, Florida and earned a bachelor's degree from the University of Miami in 1945. He received an MA from the University of North Carolina in 1947, studied for a time at Stanford University, and ultimately earned a doctorate from the University of Iowa in 1954. He went on to teach for many years at the Iowa Writers' Workshop, the nation's first graduate program in creative writing. He also taught at Syracuse University, the University of California at Irvine, Princeton University, the University of Virginia, and the University of Florida in Gainesville.

Justice published thirteen collections of his poetry. The first collection, The Summer Anniversaries, was the winner of the Lamont Poetry Prize given by the Academy of American Poets in 1961; Selected Poems won the Pulitzer Prize for Poetry in 1980. He was awarded the Bollingen Prize in Poetry in 1991, and the Lannan Literary Award for Poetry in 1996.

His honors also included grants from the Guggenheim Foundation, the Rockefeller Foundation, and the National Endowment for the Arts. He was a member of the American Academy of Arts and Letters, and a Chancellor of the Academy of American Poets from 1997 to 2003. His Collected Poems was nominated for the National Book Award in 2004. Justice was also a National Book Award Finalist in 1961, 1974, and 1995.

In his obituary, Andrew Rosenheim notes that Justice "was a legendary teacher, and despite his own Formalist reputation influenced a wide range of younger writers — his students included Mark Jarman, Rita Dove, James Tate, C. Dale Young, Ellen Bryant Voigt, Will Schmitz, Mark Strand, William Stafford, and the novelist John Irving." His student and later colleague Marvin Bell said in a reminiscence, "As a teacher, Don chose always to be on the side of the poem, defending it from half-baked attacks by students anxious to defend their own turf. While he had firm preferences in private, as a teacher Don defended all turfs. He had little use for poetic theory..."

Of Justice's accomplishments as a poet, his former student, the poet and critic Tad Richards, noted that "Donald Justice is likely to be remembered as a poet who gave his age a quiet but compelling insight into loss and distance, and who set a standard for craftsmanship, attention to detail, and subtleties of rhythm."

Justice's work was the subject of the 1998 volume Certain Solitudes: On The Poetry of Donald Justice, a collection of essays edited by Dana Gioia and William Logan.

Death
Justice died August 6, 2004, at an Iowa City, Iowa nursing home. He had been in a nursing home after suffering a stroke several weeks before his death. He was 78 years old. His family said the immediate cause of death was pneumonia, but that he also had Parkinson's disease.

Published work

Poetry collections

The Old Bachelor and Other Poems (Pandanus Press, Miami, FL), 1951.
The Summer Anniversaries (Wesleyan University Press, Middletown, CT), 1960; revised edition (University Press of New England, Hanover, NH), 1981.
A Local Storm (Stone Wall Press, Iowa City, IA, 1963).
Night Light (Wesleyan University Press, Middletown, CT, 1967); revised edition (University Press of New England, Hanover, NH, 1981).
Sixteen Poems (Stone Wall Press, Iowa City, IA, 1970).
From a Notebook (Seamark Press, Iowa City, IA, 1971).
Departures (Atheneum, New York, NY, 1973).
Selected Poems (Atheneum, New York, NY, 1979).
Tremayne (Windhover Press, Iowa City, IA, 1984).
The Sunset Maker (Anvil Press Poetry, 1987). .
A Donald Justice Reader (Middlebury, 1991). .
New and Selected Poems (Knopf, 1995). .
Orpheus Hesitated beside the Black River: Poems, 1952-1997 (Anvil Press Poetry, London, England), 1998.
Collected Poems (Knopf, 2004).  .

Essay and interview collections
Platonic Scripts, 1984
Oblivion: On Writers and Writing, 1998
Compendium: A Collection of Thoughts on Prosody. ed. David Koehn & Alan Soldofsky (Omnidawn, 2017).

Edited volumes
Justice edited posthumous selections of unpublished poetry for four poets: Weldon Kees, Henri Coulette, Raeburn Miller, and Joe Bolton.

 The first edition of this collection was published in 1960.

Libretti
The Young God - A Vaudeville (opera by Edward Miller), 1969
The Death of Lincoln: an opera by Edwin London on an original libretto by Donald Justice, 1988

Further reading
Justice, Donald and Hoy, Richard (2002). Donald Justice in Conversation With Philip Hoy (Between the Lines). .

See also

 Donald Justice Poetry Prize
 American poetry

References

External links

Renner, B. (1997). "Donald Justice interview", Elimae (an electronic literary magazine).
Biography and links to several poems at the Poetry Foundation website. Retrieved November 9, 2007.

1925 births
2004 deaths
University of Florida faculty
Formalist poets
American male poets
Writers from Miami
Pulitzer Prize for Poetry winners
University of Miami alumni
University of Iowa faculty
Syracuse University faculty
University of Virginia faculty
Princeton University faculty
University of California, Irvine faculty
Iowa Writers' Workshop alumni
Iowa Writers' Workshop faculty
Poets from Florida
Bollingen Prize recipients
20th-century American poets
20th-century American male writers
Deaths from pneumonia in Iowa
Members of the American Academy of Arts and Letters